Dale Ferguson (born 13 April 1988) is a Scotland international rugby league footballer who plays as a  or  for Dewsbury Rams in the Betfred Championship.

He previously played in the Super League for the Wakefield Trinity Wildcats and the Huddersfield Giants in two separate spells, as well spending time at Hull Kingston Rovers on loan from Huddersfield. He has also played for the Bradford Bulls in the Super League and the Kingstone Press Championship. In 2019 he was loaned from the Giants to Featherstone in the Championship. He played one game for the England Knights side in 2012.

Background
Ferguson was born in Pontefract, Yorkshire, England.

Playing career
On 3 November 2011 The annual RLIF Awards dinner was held at the Tower of London, and Ferguson was named Scotland player of the year.

In February 2013, Hull Kingston Rovers signed Ferguson on a one-month loan deal. He scored his first try for The Robins in their 44–18 win over the Widnes club on 17 February 2013.

Bradford Bulls
Midway through the 2013 season the Bradford Bulls announced that they had signed Ferguson for the 2014 and 2015 seasons on a two-year deal.

2014
Ferguson missed the pre-season games against Hull FC and Dewsbury due to injury. He did feature in the friendly against Castleford Tigers.

He missed Rounds 1–7 due to injury. Ferguson featured in Round 8 (Salford) to Round 9 (Leeds) then in Round 15 (Wakefield Trinity Wildcats). Fergusok was injured for Rounds 16–22 but played in Round 23 against (Leeds) to Round 25 (Castleford Tigers). He featured in Round 4 (Oldham) in the Challenge Cup.

Even though the Bradford outfit were relegated and would play in the Championship in 2015, Ferguson committed himself to Bradford until the end of the 2016 season.

2015

Ferguson did not feature in any of the pre-season friendlies.

He featured in Round 3 (Featherstone Rovers) to Round 4 (Hunslet Hawks) then in Round 6 (Workington Town) to Round 7 (Halifax). He also featured in Round 9 (London Broncos) to Round 12 (Whitehaven). He played in Round 17 against Dewsbury to Round 21 against Sheffield. Ferguson played in Qualifier 1 against (Sheffield) to Qualifier 6 (Leigh). Ferguson played in the £1 Million Game (Wakefield Trinity Wildcats). He also featured in the Challenge Cup in Round 4 (Workington Town) to Round 5 (Hull Kingston Rovers).

2016

Ferguson featured in both pre-season friendlies against Leeds and Castleford Tigers.

He featured in Round 1 (Featherstone Rovers) to Round 4 against Leigh then in Round 6 against Batley. He played in Round 8 (Halifax) to Round 12 (London Broncos). Ferguson featured in Round 14 Sheffield to Round 17 (Workington Town) then in Round 22 (Oldham) to Round 23 (Featherstone Rovers). He played in the Championship Shield in Game 5 Swinton to the Final Sheffield. Ferguson played in the Challenge Cup in the 4th against Dewsbury.

At the end of the season Ferguson signed a two-year deal with Huddersfield.

Dewsbury Rams
On 13 October 2021 it was reported that he had signed for Dewsbury in the RFL Championship

International career
Ferguson made his Scotland début in 2010, in a defeat by Wales. He was named in the Scotland squad for the 2013 Rugby League World Cup.

In October and November 2015, Ferguson played in the 2015 European Cup.

References

External links
Huddersfield Giants profile
Wakefield Wildcats profile
Wildcats squad: Dale Ferguson
SL profile
2017 RLWC profile
Scotland profile
Scotland RL profile

1988 births
Living people
Bradford Bulls players
Dewsbury Rams players
England Knights national rugby league team players
English people of Scottish descent
English rugby league players
Featherstone Rovers players
Huddersfield Giants players
Rugby league players from Pontefract
Rugby league second-rows
Scotland national rugby league team captains
Scotland national rugby league team players
Wakefield Trinity players